L Étang Malbaie (English: Malbaie Pond) is a freshwater body crossed by the Petite rivière Malbaie, in the unorganized territory of Lac-Pikauba, in the regional county municipality (MRC) of Charlevoix Regional County Municipality, in the administrative region of Capitale-Nationale, in the province of Quebec, in Canada. This lake which is located in a forest and mountainous area, in the eastern part of Grands-Jardins National Park.

The eastern part of Étang Malbaie is accessible by the route 381 which goes up to the north. A secondary forest road runs along the north shore of this body of water.

This mountain lake is entirely located in an area where forestry has always been the predominant economic activity; recreational tourism, second. In the middle of 19th century, recreational tourism activities took off.

Due to the altitude, this lake is normally frozen from the beginning of December to the end of April; however, the safe period for traffic on the ice is usually from mid-December to mid-April.

Geography 

The main hydrographic slopes adjacent to the Malbaie Pond are:
 to the east: Lac de la Galette;
 to the south: Pointu Lake, Roche Lake;
 to the west: Petite rivière Malbaie, Malbaie River;
 north: Petite rivière Malbaie.

The mouth of the Malbaie Pond is located to the southwest. From there, the current descends on  following the course of the Malbaie river which flows to La Malbaie in the Saint Lawrence River.

Toponymy 
The toponymic designation "Malbaie Pond" is contextual, suggesting the presence of a pond. This designation is linked to the other local toponyms using the term "Malbaie": Petit lac Malbaie, Petite rivière Malbaie and Malbaie River. The dam at the mouth of this pond was erected in 1955. This toponym appears on a document from the Ministry of Natural Resources in 1973.

The toponym “Étang Malbaie” was formalized on June 6, 1973, at the Place Names Bank of the Commission de toponymie du Québec.

See also 

 Charlevoix Regional County Municipality
 Lac-Pikauba, an unorganized territory
 Grands-Jardins National Park
 Petite rivière Malbaie
 Malbaie River

References 

Lakes of Capitale-Nationale
Charlevoix Regional County Municipality